Thomas Blatherwick Redgate (1809 – 16 February 1874) was an English first-class cricketer active 1840 who played for Nottingham Cricket Club (aka Nottinghamshire). He was born and died in Calverton, Nottinghamshire. He played in two first-class matches.

References

1809 births
1874 deaths
English cricketers
Nottinghamshire cricketers
People from Calverton, Nottinghamshire
Cricketers from Nottinghamshire